Muzha station (formerly transliterated as Mucha Station until 2003) is a station on Wenhu line of the Taipei Metro, located in Wenshan District, Taipei, Taiwan.

Station overview

This two-level, elevated station has two side platforms and a single exit. It is located between Muzha Rd. and Wanfang Rd., close to the intersection of Muzha Rd. and Jungong Rd.

The name of the station is known to cause ambiguity. "Muzha" is an area in Wenshan District, which may lead people thinking that Muzha station is in Central Muzha. However, due to the changes made during the planning of the Muzha line, the location of some of the stations were changed, and Muzha station was located about 1 km away from Central Muzha. This is also why the passenger volume of the station has always been low in the stations of Taipei Metro.

Station layout

Exits
Single Exit: Muzha Rd (Sec. 4), Jungong Rd., Muzha Vocational High School

Around the station
Jungong Community
Yuanye Sports Park
Bojia Elementary School
Bojia Sports Park
Muzha Vocational High School
Daonan Riverside Park
Wenshan District Office

References

Railway stations opened in 1996
Wenhu line stations